D'Iberville High School is a suburban public high school located in D'Iberville, Mississippi, United States, with a Biloxi postal address. A new high school building was dedicated on March 15, 2009 at 15625 Lamey Bridge Road. The former high school building, located at 3320 Warrior Drive, is now D'Iberville Middle School. The high school is part of the Harrison County School District, serves 1,290 students as of the 2019–2020 school year, and consists of students from North Woolmarket and D'Iberville middle schools.

Athletics
The school's Varsity football team won the 4A state championship in 2002.

Notable alumni
Reggie Collier, former NFL quarterback (1986–87)
Christine Kozlowski, crowned Miss Mississippi in 2008
Kevin Norwood, wide receiver for the Carolina Panthers
Chase Sherman, professional Mixed Martial Artist

References

External links
 

Public high schools in Mississippi
Schools in Harrison County, Mississippi
School buildings completed in 2009